Vishnuvardhana IV was the tenth king of the Eastern Chalukyas, which ruled the region of Vengi. He reigned from 772 AD to 808 AD. He had martial  ties with the imperial Rashtrakutas. The Rashtrakuta emperor Dhruva Dharavarsha gave his daughter, Silabhattarika, in marriage to Vishnuvardhana IV to forge an alliance with the Western Ganga Dynasty after defeating and humbling him in 784. His predecessor was  Vijayaditya I (755 – 772 AD) and was succeeded by Vijayaditya II (808 – 847 AD).

References

1. Kamath, Suryanath U. (2001) [1980]. A concise history of Karnataka: from pre-historic times to the present. Bangalore: Jupiter books. LCCN 80905179. OCLC 7796041.

2. Nilakanta Sastri, K.A. (1955). A History of South India, OUP, New Delhi (Reprinted 2002).

3. Arthikaje. "The Rashtrakutas". History of Karnataka. OurKarnataka.Com. Archived from the original on 4 November 2006. Retrieved 31 December 2006.

People of the Western Ganga dynasty
Hindu monarchs
8th-century Indian monarchs
9th-century Indian monarchs